The Manitoba Major Soccer League is an adult soccer system based in Manitoba, Canada. MMSL league are both indoor and outdoor. It is sanctioned by the Manitoba Soccer Association, a branch of the Canadian Soccer Association.

The highest level of amateur soccer in the province of Manitoba is the MMSL Premier Division. Winners of the MSA Cup are eligible to represent the province and compete for the Challenge Trophy, the highest national amateur cup competition in Canada sanctioned by the CSA.

Players come with a variety of playing backgrounds, including high school, college, university, academies, semi-professional, and ex-professionals.

History 
Founded in 1971, the league was previously known as Manitoba Central Soccer League (1971–1999) and the Molson Super Soccer Alliance (1990–1999). A non-profit organization, the league is overseen by a volunteer board.

League structure
MMSL features over 85 teams overall, who compete in 9 outdoor divisions. In the winter months MMSL offer indoor league play at 6 levels of competition.

Playoff divisional champions receive a cash-prize of $250.

Champions 

 1971 Italinter
 1972-78 unknown
 1979 Italinter
 1980 Portuguese
 1981 Tatra
 1982 Winnipeg Bari
 1983 Ital Inter
 1984 Italinter
 1985 Italinter
 1987 Lucania
 1988MCSL Germania Kickers
 1988SSA  Lucania
 1989MCSL Germania Kickers
 1989SSA  Lucania
 1990MCSL Grant Mill Sword
 1990SSA  Lucania
 1991MCSL Sokol
 1991SSA  Lucania

 1992MCSL Britannia Rovers
 1992SSA  Lucania
 1993MCSL Thistle
 1993SSA  Lucania
 1994MCSL Sokol
 1994SSA  Lucania
 1995MCSL Romainia
 1995SSA  Lucania
 1996MCSL Thistle
 1997MCSL Grant Mill
 1997SSA  Lucania
 1998MCSL White Eagles
 1999MCSL White Eagles
 1999SSA  Lucania & Sons of Italy
 2000 Britannia Rovers
 2001 Grant Mill Sword
 2002 Sokol S.C.
 2003 Sons of Italy Lions S.C.

 2004 Sons of Italy Lions S.C.
 2005 Lucania S.C.
 2006 Sons of Italy Lions S.C.
 2007 Sons of Italy Lions S.C.
 2008 Lucania S.C.
 2009 Hellas S.C.
 2010 Sons of Italy Lions S.C.
 2011 Sons of Italy Lions S.C.
 2012 Hellas S.C.
 2013 FC Winnipeg Lions
 2014 FC Winnipeg Lions
 2015 FC Winnipeg Lions
 2016 FC Winnipeg Lions
 2017 FC Winnipeg Lions
 2018 FC Winnipeg Lions
 2019 FC Winnipeg Lions
 2020 Ital-Inter SC

Play-off 

 2005 Lucania S.C.
 2006 Lucania S.C.

 2007 F.C. Lusitania
 2008 Lucania S.C.

 2009 Hellas S.C.

References

External links
 MMSL website

Soccer in Manitoba
Soccer leagues in Canada
1971 establishments in Manitoba
Sports leagues established in 1971